2004 World Championships may refer to:

 Alpine skiing: Alpine World Ski Championships 2004
 Aquatics: 2004 World Aquatics Championships
 Athletics: 2004 World Championships in Athletics
Cross-country running: 2004 IAAF World Cross Country Championships
Road running: 2004 IAAF World Road Running Championships
 Badminton: 2004 BWF World Championships
 Bandy: Bandy World Championship 2004
 Biathlon: Biathlon World Championships 2004
 Boxing: 2004 World Amateur Boxing Championships
 Chess: FIDE World Chess Championship 2004
 Curling:
 2004 World Men's Curling Championship
 2004 World Women's Curling Championship
 Darts: 2004 BDO World Darts Championship
 Darts: 2004 PDC World Darts Championship
 Figure skating: 2004 World Figure Skating Championships
 Ice hockey: 2004 Men's World Ice Hockey Championships
 Ice hockey: 2004 Women's World Ice Hockey Championships
 Netball: 2004 Netball World Championships
 Nordic skiing: FIS Nordic World Ski Championships 2004
 Speed skating:
Allround: 2004 World Allround Speed Skating Championships
Sprint: 2004 World Sprint Speed Skating Championships
Single distances: 2004 World Single Distance Speed Skating Championships

See also
 2004 World Cup (disambiguation)
 2004 Continental Championships (disambiguation)
 2004 World Junior Championships (disambiguation)